Monte Pascoal National Park is a national park in the state of Bahia, Brazil.

Location

The National and Historical park is in the Atlantic Forest biome.
It was created by decree 242 of 29 November 1961, modified by decree 3.421 of 20 April 2000, and is administered by the Chico Mendes Institute for Biodiversity Conservation.
It became part of the Central Atlantic Forest Ecological Corridor, created in 2002.
The reserve covers parts of the municipalities of Porto Seguro and Prado in the state of Bahia.

It is part of the Discovery Coast Atlantic Forest Reserves, a group of eight protected areas holding  of the Atlantic Forest biome, that has been designated as a World Heritage Site.
The park contains and takes its name from Monte Pascoal, the first land seen by the Portuguese explorer Pedro Álvares Cabral.

Conservation

The park is classified as IUCN protected area category II (national park).
It has the objectives of preserving natural ecosystems of great ecological relevance and scenic beauty, enabling scientific research, environmental education, outdoors recreation and eco-tourism.

Protected birds in the reserve include red-browed amazon (Amazona rhodocorytha), white-necked hawk (Buteogallus lacernulatus), ringed woodpecker (Celeus torquatus), black-headed berryeater (Carpornis melanocephala), red-billed curassow (Crax blumenbachii), banded cotinga (Cotinga maculata), band-tailed antwren (Myrmotherula urosticta) and the ochre-marked parakeet (Pyrrhura cruentata).
Other protected species include the jaguar (Panthera onca), cougar (Puma concolor), giant armadillo (Priodontes maximus), the fish Mimagoniates sylvicola and the ant Dinoponera lucida.

Notes

Sources

1961 establishments in Brazil
National parks of Brazil
World Heritage Sites in Brazil
Protected areas of Bahia
Protected areas established in 1961
Protected areas of the Atlantic Forest